The Fender Noiseless series is a line of electric guitar pickups made by the Fender Musical Instruments Corporation designed to cancel 60 cycle (Hz) hum noise while retaining the characteristic sound of single coil pickups. Introduced in 1998, these pickups consist of a pair of single coils stacked one on top of the other, compacted so as to match the shape and width space as a traditional Fender single coil guitar pickup, while being only slightly taller. The upper coil is actually the sound source, while  the lower coil is responsible for the 60-cycle hum attenuation.  Alnico V magnetic bars span from one coil to  the other, crossing a soft ferrous steel spacer plate that  isolates them, without touching it.  The spacer plate has mainly two functions: to isolate the lower coil from the vibrations of the string, making sure that the sound is picked up only from the upper one, and to increase the magnetic flux that passed through both coils, increasing the output of the pickup.  This is to be contrasted with the original noise  canceling pickup, the humbucker, which is a double-wide, horizontally adjacent pair of single coil pickups with opposing phase.

The series includes models for electric guitars and bass guitars.

Pre-Fender Noiseless

From 1987 to 1998 Fender used Lace Sensor pickups on its Strat Plus model Stratocaster. Lace Sensors are an innovative design of pickups using a unique radiant field barrier system that surrounds both the coil and magnets, eliminating annoying 60 cycle hum. The patented Lace Micro Matrix Combs replace traditional bobbins, yielding a wider tonal range and better string balance than traditional pickups. Lace Sensors were also configured on some Fender models as Dually pickups (two adjacent single coils operating as a quasi-humbucking pickup).  Lace Sensor pickups are still available from Lace Music Products with many more variations than offered on Fender guitars. The pickups installed on Strat Plus guitars display “Fender Lace Sensor” on the cover. Later “post-Fender” versions sold by the Lace Music Co. have "Lace Sensor" embossed on the cover. The Gold Lace Sensor model was the pickup of choice for years by Jeff Beck, Eric Clapton, and Buddy Guy on their Signature Series Stratocasters. The Strat Plus Standard uses three Gold Lace pickups, but other varieties of Lace Sensor pickups were use by Fender on different models of the Strat Plus.

Vintage Noiseless

The Noiseless pickups now referred to as Vintage Noiseless were original equipment on the Fender American Deluxe Series Stratocasters made between 1998 and 2003. They are now widely used on many Fender guitars made in their Ensenada, Mexico facility (so-called "Made in Mexico", or "MIM" guitars) and Fender Custom Shop guitars, and have been the stock pickups on the Eric Clapton Stratocaster signature model since 2001. Vintage Noiseless pickups and are still sold by Fender. Vintage Noiseless pickups use Alnico II magnets. These pickups were the result of three years of research aimed at combining the advantages of single coils with those of humbuckers: the characteristic sound of the former and the silence of the latter. Fender's intent was to develop a pickup that could evoke the vintage  Stratocaster sound and the silence of Lace Sensor pickups.  The Stratocaster version is identified by the word "Noiseless" in gold cursive on the aged white or black pickup covers and the use of staggered pole pieces. The Stratocaster set of Vintage Noiseless pickups comes packaged with two 1MΩ potentiometers ("pots") and a .022µF capacitor for tone controls, one 500kΩ pot for volume control, a 680pF capacitor and a 220kΩ resistor for a treble bleed circuit, and a wiring diagram. Vintage Noiseless pickup sets are also available for the Telecaster and Jazz Bass.
Features include:
PolySol-coated magnet wire
Staggered, hand-beveled pole pieces
Alnico II magnets 
 Fiber bobbin
 Vinyl-coated output wire
 Neck/Middle/Bridge output: 9.8kΩ
 Neck/Middle/Bridge Inductance: 3.0 Henries

Samarium Cobalt Noiseless (SCN)
The Samarium Cobalt Noiseless (SCN)  series was a subsequent line of stacked electric guitar and bass pickups; these were designed by Bill Lawrence with the goal of further reducing noise while improving the "single coil" tone of the pickup  and were fine tuned by Fender. Introduced in 2004, they were similar to the Vintage Noiseless pickups, but Lawrence's research into controlling magnetic eddy currents led him to employ miniaturized samarium cobalt alloy magnets instead of Alnico V. Samarium cobalt is a rare earth magnet that is more powerful than the Alnico V magnets traditionally used in pickup design. The SCN pickups were a standard equipment feature on the American Deluxe series Stratocaster from 2004 to 2010, and were available for the Telecaster and Jazz Bass, but are no longer manufactured by Fender. The earliest Stratocaster SCN pickups had no external marking; later models had the SCN logo lightly stamped on the bottom right corner of the pickup covers,  but the letters were not colored, making them hard to discern. The covers were available in white, black, aged white and parchment, but the Tele sets were offered in black and chrome only.

SCN features include:
Noise-free design
Traditional and samarium cobalt magnetic material
Wider, softer magnetic field
Neck - L: 2.4H, DC resistance: 6.5kΩ
Middle - L: 2.4H, DC resistance: 6.5kΩ
Bridge - L: 3.8H, DC resistance: 11.5kΩ

Hot SCN
Hot SCN pickups were used only on the HSS (Humbucker/Single/Single) American Deluxe Stratocaster from 2004 to 2010. Hot SCN pickups claim a hotter output than a standard SCN Strat pickup and were designed for proper balance with a hot humbucker in the bridge position. The American Deluxe Series HSS Strat was designed with one single coil SCN pickup in the neck position, one single coil Hot SCN pickup in the middle, and one DH-1 ("Atomic") humbucking pickup at the bridge.

Hot Noiseless (Ceramic Noiseless)

The Fender Hot Noiseless (Ceramic Noiseless) Strat Pickups are an overwound version of the original Fender Noiseless pickups with ceramic magnets. Ceramic magnets are quite strong and as such are normally hotter. The hotter (higher DC resistance) a pickup is the more it is going to push an amp and typically the more it is going to overdrive/distort. They produce pronounced mids and a quick bass response. The strong magnets allows the pickup to retain articulation and clarity, even when introduced to extreme gain. These pickups are identified by the word "Noiseless" in silver cursive on the aged white pickup cover, just like the Vintage Noiseless. However, they can be distinguished by the fact that all pole pieces are flat (non-staggered). Hot Noiseless Strat pickups have been standard on the Jeff Beck signature model since 2001, but were never available on the American Deluxe. They are still available from the Fender Custom Shop. Features include:
Ceramic magnets
Polysol-coated magnet wire
Flush-mount pole pieces for every string
Vinyl-coated output wire and plastic bobbin
DC resistance: 10.4kΩ (Neck/Middle/Bridge)
Inductance 3.0 Henrys (Neck/Middle/Bridge)

N3 Noiseless

N3 Noiseless pickups were available on  American Deluxe Stratocasters from 2010 until 2016, at which time the American Deluxe was superseded by the Elite Series Stratocaster. The N3 Noiseless set was designed with different types of magnets at the three pickup positions: Alnico III at the neck for a rounder sound, Alnico II at the middle for a sweeter sound, and Alnico V at the bridge for a hotter sound. N3 Noiseless pickups were manufactured by Fender for the Stratocaster, Telecaster, and Jazz Bass but are no longer available from Fender. They are identified by the cursive Fender logo and "N3" in silver cursive on the white pickup cover.

N3 features included:
DC resistance: 6.8kΩ
Three types of magnets:
Neck: Alnico III 
Middle: Alnico II
Bridge: Alnico V 
 Mildly staggered and beveled pole pieces
Formvar magnet wire
Vinyl-coated output wire
Solder-less printed circuit board bobbin

Gen 4 Noiseless
Gen 4 Noiseless pickups were installed on the Fender Elite Stratocaster from 2016 to 2019. They are identified by the cursive Fender logo and the word "NOISELESS" in silver, upper case, block letters on the aged white or black pickup covers, the underside of the pickups have "N4 MVT" printed on them. Gen 4 Noiseless pickups for the Stratocaster, Telecaster, and Jazz Bass are still available from Fender.

N4 features include:
Noise-free, vintage-style tone
Shielded wire for even more noise reduction
Alnico V magnets
Mildly staggered pole pieces
DC Resistance:
Bridge: 10.3K
Middle: 10.3K
Neck: 10.3K
Inductance 
Neck/Middle: 3.2 Henries
Bridge: 3.6 Henries
Lead wire color identifies neck/middle/bridge

Ultra Noiseless
Ultra Noiseless pickups were introduced on the Fender Ultra Stratocaster, Ultra Jazzmaster, Ultra Telecaster, and Ultra Precision Bass in 2019. The Ultra Noiseless pickups are a complete redesign over the Gen 4 Noiseless pickups, including different magnets and staggered, unbeveled pole pieces. Ultra Noiseless pickups come in two versions. The Ultra Noiseless Vintage pickups come standard on the Ultra Telecaster and Ultra Stratocaster SSS, and are said to deliver "authentic Fender single coil sound without hum." Two Ultra Noiseless Hot pickups are standard on the Ultra Stratocaster HSS, and are said to offer modern performance and classic tone so the user can launch their amp into overdrive. They are paired with a Shawbucker Double Tap humbucking pickup in the bridge position, which can be used either as a single coil or as a full humbucker.  Visually, they are identical to Gen 4 Noiseless, with the cursive Fender logo and the word "NOISELESS" in silver upper case block letters on the aged white or black pickup covers. The hot version uses gold lettering. The underside of the vintage pickups are inscribed "ULTRA STRAT VINTAGE", while the hot version pickups bottoms are blue with the inscription "ULTRA STRAT MODERN". Each pickup has three leads. All black and green wires are grounds; the “hot” leads are red (bridge), blue (middle), white (neck). Both versions are currently sold by Fender as retail packages.

Ultra Noiseless Hot pickup set features include:
Polysol coated magnet wire
Staggered non-beveled polepieces 
Alnico V magnets 
Vinyl lead wire
Installation hardware 
DC Resistance
SSS Ultra Stratocaster
Neck: 7.9-8.7kΩ
Middle: 7.9-8.7kΩ
Bridge: 21.6-22.2kΩ
HSS Ultra Stratocaster
Neck: 12.3-12.9kΩ
Middle: 12.3-12.9kΩ
Bridge: 14.21kΩ Shawbucker Double Tap
Inductance 
Neck: 3.75 Henrys
Middle: 3.75 Henrys
Bridge: 6.6 Henrys

Player Plus Noiseless
Player Plus Noiseless pickups were introduced on the Fender Player Plus Stratocaster and the Player Plus Telecaster in 2021. Some consider these pickups to be a modern version of the original Vintage Noiseless pickups. They are identified by the word "Noiseless" in gold cursive on the aged white pickup cover, similar to the Vintage Noiseless. The Player Plus noiseless pickups use Alnico V magnets and are hotter than the Vintage Noiseless Alnico II pickups. Fender installs them with 1MΩ pots for both tone and volume controls in the Player Plus guitars. Technical details for these pickups:
Flush-mount pole pieces 
DC resistance
Neck: 10.2-10.4 KΩ
Middle: 10.2-10.4 KΩ
Bridge 10.7-10.9 KΩ

Fender Guitar Models Configured with Fender Noiseless Pickups
 
Jeff Beck Signature Stratocaster
Eric Clapton Signature Stratocaster
American Deluxe Stratocaster
Deluxe Roadhouse Stratocaster
Elite Stratocaster
Ultra Stratocaster
Ultra Luxe Stratocaster
Player Plus Stratocaster
 H.E.R. Signature Stratocaster
 Tom Morello Stratocaster 
 Deluxe Player (Super Stratocaster)
 Player Plus Telecaster
 Ultra Telecaster 
 Ultra Luxe Telecaster
 American Ultra Jazzmaster

References

Guitar pickups
Fender Musical Instruments Corporation